Hawaii Technology Institute is a non-profit, vocational school located in Honolulu, Hawaii. It is licensed by the State of Hawaii Department of Education as a private trade, vocational, and technical school.

Conceived as a job-training center in Honolulu, it was formed in 1986 through a partnership between Alu Like, Inc. and IBM Corporation. Its present location is 1130 North Nimitz Highway, Suite A-226, Honolulu, Hawaii.

Educational institutions established in 1986
1986 establishments in Hawaii
Education in Honolulu
Technical schools